Ofrenda is the debut album by Mexican singer-songwriter Lila Downs. It was released in 1994; the songs are a collection of traditional songs from Oaxaca, Mexico,  and also contains songs written by the singer. The songs on this album are sung in Spanish, Mixtec and Zapotec, the latter two being languages native to the State of Oaxaca. Lila Downs recorded this LP independently with the support of Oaxacan Institute of Cultures in 1992 and 1994.

With this material Lila Downs became known in some areas of the State of Oaxaca, mostly concentrated in cafes, bars and nightclubs around the City of Oaxaca. And since the album wasn't promoted much, only about 1000 copies were published  in Mexico alone. This album is now discontinued and is no longer part of the official discography of Lila Downs.

This album, which was not commercially successful and was widely dismissed, was promoted only in LP and cassette, and has never been released on CD.

Tracks
 "La Sandunga"
 "La Llorona"
 "Yucu Yucu Ninu"
 "Ofrenda"
 "Xquenda"
 "Canción Mixteca"
 "Dios nunca muere"
 "Sabor a Mí"
 "Pobre Changuita"

Notes

External links
 Lila Downs "Ofrenda" Lirycs.time

1994 debut albums
Lila Downs albums